Cintray may refer to communes in France:

Cintray, Eure
Cintray, Eure-et-Loir

See also
Cintra (disambiguation)
Cintré, in the Ille-et-Vilaine département 
Cintrey, in the Haute-Saône département